The Führerhauptquartier Anlage Mitte, also known as Askania Mitte, was a bunker planned as a Führer Headquarters  for Adolf Hitler, who never used it. It was built during the Second World War near Tomaszów Mazowiecki in central Poland.

The facility consisted of two railway bunkers. One bunker was at the village of Konewka the other at the village of Jelen. The complex has not been destroyed, is in good condition and can be visited.

References 
Notes

Bibliography
 Neumärker, Uwe; Conrad, Robert; and Woywodt, Cord (2012) "Wolfsschanze": Hitlers Machtzentrale im Zweiten Weltkrieg. Ch. Links Verlag. .S. 37 ff.
Seidler, Franz, W. (2000) "Dieter Zeigert: Die Führerhauptquartiere 1939-45" in Anlagen und Planungen im Zweiten Weltkrieg. Munich: F. A. Herbig Verlagsbuchhandlung

External links 
Pictures of the bunkers

World War II sites of Nazi Germany
Fuehrer Headquarters
World War II sites in Poland